That'll Be The Day is the second and final studio album from Buddy Holly. Decca, Holly’s first major record label, after failing to produce a hit single from Holly’s early recordings, packaged these 1956 tunes after he had some success with recordings from the Brunswick and Coral labels, especially the previously released single "That'll Be the Day". This is the last album released before his death in a plane crash on February 3, 1959, and is rare among collectors.

Background
Recordings were done in three different sessions typically running just 3 hours long, January, July and November 1956 at Bradley Film and Recording Studios, 804 16th Ave. So., Nashville, Tennessee. From these sessions a single was released on April 16, 1956 (D 29854), "Blue Days, Black Nights" / "Love Me". A second single "Modern Don Juan / You Are My One Desire" (D 30166) was released December 24, 1956. Low sales convinced Decca to shelve the remaining tracks.

When Buddy Holly found new fame with his re-recording of "That'll Be the Day" with his band the Crickets, Decca began to issue Holly's recordings from these sessions as singles, which culminated in a full-length LP as well as an accompanying EP.

The Decca 1956 Nashville recordings were repackaged several times. Instruments and background vocals were added with later releases as late as 1984. The mid-1970s British album The Nashville Sessions is the best of the vinyl editions according to Allmusic.

The album reached no. 5 on the UK album chart in 1961 in a re-release. The album was re-released in 1967 under the title The Great Buddy Holly.

Track listing

1999 Bonus tracks

Personnel
Buddy Holly* – vocal & guitar
Sonny Curtis* – lead guitar
Grady Martin* – rhythm guitar
Doug Kirkham* – bass and percussion
Don Guess* – bass
Jerry Allison* – drums
Harold Bradley – guitar
Floyd Cramer – piano
Farris Coursey – drums
E.R. "Dutch" McMillan – alto saxophone
Owen Bradley – piano
Boots Randolph – saxophone

* line up on July 22 credited as "The Three Tunes".  According to buddyhollycenter.org the group name was Buddy and the Two Tones (i.e. Buddy Holly with Don Guess and Sonny Curtis).

Owen Bradley produced the sessions.
The Picks added background harmonies.

Charts

Album

References

External links

Buddy Holly: That'll Be The Day: Decca DL 8707 - April 1958
Buddy Holly: That'll Be The Day
Dates And Recording Information - Nashville and Clovis 1956 (Researched and Compiled by Terry R. Shaw Copyright © 2000 by Terry R. Shaw)
2006 April Music Memorabilia Auction #622 
Buddyhollyonline

Buddy Holly albums
Albums produced by Owen Bradley
1958 albums
Decca Records albums